In mathematics, Liouville's theorem, originally formulated by Joseph Liouville in 1833 to 1841, places an important restriction on antiderivatives that can be expressed as elementary functions.

The antiderivatives of certain elementary functions cannot themselves be expressed as elementary functions.  These are called nonelementary antiderivatives. A standard example of such a function is  whose antiderivative is (with a multiplier of a constant) the error function, familiar from statistics.  Other examples include the functions  and 

Liouville's theorem states that elementary antiderivatives, if they exist, must be in the same differential field as the function, plus possibly a finite number of logarithms.

Definitions

This has the form of a logarithmic derivative.
.

Basic theorem

Then there exist  and  such that

In other words, the only functions that have "elementary antiderivatives" (that is, antiderivatives living in, at worst, an elementary differential extension of ) are those with this form.  Thus, on an intuitive level, the theorem states that the only elementary antiderivatives are the "simple" functions plus a finite number of logarithms of "simple" functions.

A proof of Liouville's theorem can be found in section 12.4 of Geddes, et al.

Examples

As an example, the field  of rational functions in a single variable has a derivation given by the standard derivative with respect to that variable.  The constants of this field are just the complex numbers  that is, 

The function  which exists in  does not have an antiderivative in   Its antiderivatives  do, however, exist in the logarithmic extension 

Likewise, the function  does not have an antiderivative in   Its antiderivatives  do not seem to satisfy the requirements of the theorem, since they are not (apparently) sums of rational functions and logarithms of rational functions.  However, a calculation with Euler's formula  shows that in fact the antiderivatives can be written in the required manner (as logarithms of rational functions).

Relationship with differential Galois theory

Liouville's theorem is sometimes presented as a theorem in differential Galois theory, but this is not strictly true.  The theorem can be proved without any use of Galois theory.  Furthermore, the Galois group of a simple antiderivative is either trivial (if no field extension is required to express it), or is simply the additive group of the constants (corresponding to the constant of integration).  Thus, an antiderivative's differential Galois group does not encode enough information to determine if it can be expressed using elementary functions, the major condition of Liouville's theorem.

See also

Notes

References

External links

 

Differential algebra
Differential equations
Field (mathematics)
Theorems in algebra